Patria Jefferies is the co-founder of Dôme Coffees Australia, and was an executive director of Celebrate WA, a non-profit organisation that organises Western Australia Day celebrations. Jefferies is credited with being an influential figure in Perth's coffee culture, making it part of daily life.

Early life
Jefferies was born in San Francisco, the daughter of Greek-Irish Americans. She moved to Perth, Western Australia in 1986, where she worked for the Matilda Bay Brewing Company. In 1989 Jefferies met Phil May. They became business partners, along with Phil Sexton from the Matilda Bay Brewing Company, starting Dôme Coffees Australia in 1990 and opening the first Dôme cafe in Cottesloe in 1991.

Dôme

The initial Dôme cafe quickly became successful, despite the controversial amount, $1.80, charged for a cup of coffee.

Dôme expanded into an international company that imported, roasted, and exported coffee beans, as well as becoming a franchise chain of cafes in Australia, South East Asia, Indonesia and the Middle East.

Jefferies was a finalist in the 1997 Ethnic Business Awards. At the time, she said the vision for Dôme was "to be internationally recognised as the best coffee roaster in the world", and was inspired her father's slogan "make a difference".

By the end of the decade Dôme was a multi-million dollar business, and by the end of 2003 had approximately 100 stores across nine countries. In December 2003 Jefferies and May sold it to private equity funded executivesSexton had been bought out several years prior.

Later years
Jefferies later became a consultant. She also became involved with charitable and artistic organisations.

Jefferies was recognised as one of the most influential Western Australian businesspeople in The West Australian 2013 list of the 100 most influential.

References

Living people
Year of birth missing (living people)
20th-century Australian businesspeople
21st-century Australian businesspeople
Australian women in business
20th-century Australian women